This is a list of Polish television related events from 1999.

Events
Unknown - Marcin Szaniawski, performing as Jay Kay wins the second and final series of Zostań gwiazdą.

Debuts

International

Television shows

1990s
Klan (1997–present)

Ending this year

Zostań gwiazdą (1998-1999)

Births

Deaths